The following are the national records in track cycling in Pakistan, maintained by its national cycling federation, Pakistan Cycling Federation.

Men

Women

References

Pakistan
records
track cycling